Even Steven Levee (born Steven Louis Levee, 1951), is an American musician, bass player, recording engineer, record producer and former nightclub concert promoter. He is best known for his work with such bands as Lifeforce, ZRS, Brad Factor:10, The Slashtones, The Freak Parade, and his production work with Hedi, Barbara Lee George, MC Magic D and Gun Hill. As a bass player he is known for his diversity, playing with rock, funk, jazz, blues and hip hop artists, and for his use of various fretted and fretless four, five and six string bass guitars. He is also well known within the music industry for hosting premier "all star" jam sessions at various nightclubs in the New York area during the 1990s. Levee has appeared on HBO and Late Night with Conan O'Brien during the current century and continues to work in Music and the Information Technology field.

Early life
Levee was born in Crown Heights, New York, United States. He attended Miami Dade Junior College in Florida as an Art major while also playing bass in various local bands. His early musical influences of The Yardbirds, The Beatles, Jimi Hendrix and Led Zeppelin made his approach to music raw and quite loud.

Lifeforce / Lifesource
After college, Levee and future record producer, Frank Filippetti, formed the band Life Force in 1972. Life Force's blend of Rock, Jazz, Classical and Fusion led to their deal with Paramount Records. Unfortunately the Paramount Label folded before their debut album could be released. One of their songs, "Holy Moses" in 1974, was released on Streaker Records as a single, but was wrongly credited as "Force".

Life Force disbanded in 1974, but Levee and some of the other members changed their sound and formed the band Life Source. The group hit the road touring the US and Canada for the next two years with their new "Top 40s" sound.

After Life Source disbanded, Levee toured for the following three years with The Profile Band, an R&B dance band based out of Cincinnati, Ohio.

Brad Factor:10
Levee returned to New York and co-founded Brad Factor:10 (aka "The Yuppies From Hell") in 1987. The band's stage persona was "The worlds first Yuppie Heavy-Metal Band" and their music reflected that. They developed a strong "cult" following performing at major rock venues like L’Amour's, Nirvana, The Cat Club, Limelight, Black Cat, The Chance and many others. In 1988, Brad Factor:10 competed and won the "New York City Rock Wars" contest, beating out Beggars and Thieves, Skin and Bones, The Throbbs and Please (later known as Trouble Tribe). Brad Factor:10 performed with such bands as: The Tubes; Enuffz N Nuff; D' Priest, The Stuttering John Band; Circus of Power; Sophia Ramos; Cycle Sluts From Hell; Electric Angels; Pleasure Bombs; Warrior Soul, Heads Up; and Raging Slab.

Jam sessions
Beginning in 1989, Levee hosted jam sessions at many of New York City's best known rock clubs like Spodee O Dee's, Limelight, Danceteria, Space At Chase, Lion's Den, Boom and others. These jams would include musicians like: Jason Bonham, Chip Z. Nuff, Adam Bomb, Lez Warner, Ryan Roxi, Joe Lynn Turner, Mark O'Conner, LSD; Mark Wood; members of Motörhead, Jon Paris, Andy Bigan, Terry Brock, Ed Terry, Anthony Michael Hall, Herbie Trabino, Roderick Kohn, Martha Velez, Delmar Brown; Lenny Kravits; Steve Farrone; Anton Fig, Bobby Chouinard; Barry Finnerty, Jon Hammond; Paul Sheehan; Grant Green Jr and many others.

The Slashtones
In 1993, Levee was one of the original members of the band that would become known as Harry Slash & The Slashtones, later best known for their original works heard on the Extreme Championship Wrestling television programs from 1997 to 2008.  Levee remained part of the band's rotating live lineup and subsequent style changes that would include current and former members of Raging Slab, Murphy's Law, The Uptown Horns, Zebra, Riot, The John Entwistle Band, Frehley's Comet and others. Levee performed live with The Slashtones until 1995, when his need for back surgery forced him to step down from the group for a time. He would return to the stage with them in 1997 and once more in 1998.

Levee remained a fixture in The Slashtones rotating studio recording cast. He appeared on the band's 1995 limited release EP "Episode One" and on several tracks heard on the ECW television programs including the theme music for Ravishing" Rick Rude, SuperCrazy and Francine.

Levee made a return to the band's extended studio family in 2008, playing the five-string fretless bass on the band's rendition of "Friends", released on the compilation CD Tribute to Led Zeppelin, "Misty Mountain Hop",

Rattlesnake Guitar
In 1995, Viceroy Music's president, Arnie Goodman invited Levee to perform on the Peter Green tribute CD, Rattlesnake Guitar. Levee put together the band of himself, guitarist Ray Gomez from the Stanley Clarke Band and drummer Bobby Chouinard, formerly of Billy Squier. They recorded two songs, "Evil Woman Blues" and "Lazy Poker Blues", with vocalists Pete McMahon and Troy Turner. Rattlesnake Guitar also included musicians from Pink Floyd, The Yardbirds, Jeff Beck Group, The Animals, Jethro Tull, Savoy Brown, David Lee Roth, The Uptown Horns, and others. Levee's work also appears on Peter Green Song Book available via import and This Is The Blues - Volume 1 and 4 released in 2010 on Eagle Records (Fontana). This Is The Blues features performances by Jeff Beck, Jack Bruce, Savoy Brown, Mick Jagger, and Rory Gallager.

Freak Parade
From 1999 to 2002, Levee was the bass player for the band Freak Parade, featuring two original founding members of Utopia, keyboardist Moogy Klingman and drummer Kevin Ellman. The band recorded and released a studio CD titled Here Comes The and several live CDs.

Currently
Levee continued to play bass with Joy Ryder and Rhythm Club TV (until Joy's death), Barbara Lee George, The 253 Boys, the recent reformation of Brad Factor:10, Buzzy Linhart, hip-hop artist TRP, and his studio band AFU GoodFriends as well as writing, producing, recording music and voice-overs.

As co-owner of i~Potato Music, Levee is producing new Hip Hop, Folk, and RnB artists with partner Arthur Steuer, including: MC Magic D, Gun Hill, AFU GoodFriends, Voice of The People with Joe Butler (Lovin' Spoonful) and i-Potato - The Adventures of Lumpy and Homefry.

Levee has also produced, engineered and played bass with singer songwriter Barbara Lee George whose CD Protected By Love was release in 2011. Levee placed Barbara's song "To Young To Die" in a 10-hour Vietnam War special scheduled to air on History Channel in November 2011.

In addition Levee produced, engineered, played bass and co wrote the music with Don Puglisi on "The Curse", a poem by Florence Kaye. "The Curse" also appears on Don Puglisi's release Goodbye New York. In addition, Puglisi and his song "Stoned On The Range" are included on Goodbye New York, and both appear in the major motion picture Taking Woodstock. Don Puglisi is also performing with punk rockers, The 253 Boys.

Personal life
Hex Lubinger, former lead guitarist of The Shipwrecks and ¡Löco!, and Bill Grainer are cousins of Levee's .

References

Record producers from New York (state)
American bass guitarists
Living people
1951 births